MMTC: Monk, Miles, Trane & Cannon is an album by trumpeter Freddie Hubbard recorded in August 1994 and January 1995 and released on the MusicMasters label. It features performances by Hubbard, Javon Jackson, Vincent Herring, Gary Smulyan, Stephen Scott (jazz pianist), Peter Washington and Carl Allen. The album combines Hubbard's tributes to jazz legends with compositions by John Coltrane, Charles Lloyd, Thelonious Monk and Miles Davis as well as Cannonball Adderley.

Track listing 
All compositions by Freddie Hubbard except as indicated.
 "One of a Kind" – 7:09
 "Naima" (John Coltrane) – 7:12
 "Spirit of Trane" – 6:20
 "The Song My Lady Sings" (Charles Lloyd) – 7:59
 "Off Minor" (Thelonious Monk) – 5:38
 "All Blues" (Miles Davis) – 7:38
 "D Minor Mint" – 6:35
 "One for Cannon" – 6:28

Personnel 
 Freddie Hubbard – trumpet
 Carl Allen – drums
 Vincent Herring – alto saxophone
 Javon Jackson – tenor saxophone
 Stephen Scott – piano
 Gary Smulyan – baritone saxophone
 Peter Washington – double bass
 Robin Eubanks – trombone

References 

1995 albums
Freddie Hubbard albums
MusicMasters Records albums
John Coltrane tribute albums
Miles Davis tribute albums
Thelonious Monk tribute albums